Butenoic acid is any of three monocarboxylic acids with an unbranched 4-carbon chain with 3 single bonds and one double bond; that is, with the structural formula –––H (2-butenoic) or –––H (3-butenoic).

These compounds are technically mono-unsaturated fatty acids, although some authors may exclude them for being too short.  The three isomers are:
 crotonic acid (trans-2-butenoic or (2E)-but-2-enoic acid)
 isocrotonic acid (cis-2-butenoic or (2Z)-but-2-enoic acid)
 3-butenoic acid (but-3-enoic acid).

See also
Methacrylic acid, also  but branched like isobutene; a.k.a. isobutenoic acid
Butyric acid, ; a.k.a. butanoic acid

References

Carboxylic acids